The HSV Panthers are a German futsal team from Hamburg, founded in 2011 by Onur Ulusoy. Until joining Hamburger SV in 2017, the team was known as the "Hamburger Panthers". The team plays in the Futsal Bundesliga and is the German record champion with four national championship titles.

History

Championship title 
Already in the premiere season 2011/2012, the Hamburg team managed to win the North German Championship and the German Futsal Championship title by defeating Futsal Panthers Cologne 4:2 in the final. The following year, the team defended the championship title with a 6:3 victory over UFC Münster.  

In front of a record Futsal crowd of 2,200, the Hamburg side secured their third title in 2015 with a 7-4 win over Holzpfosten Schwerte. The Hamburgers won the fourth and currently last championship title in 2016 against Liria Berlin, becoming the record champions. 

In September 2017, the Panthers joined Hamburger SV and took part in the newly created Regionalliga Nord under the current team name "HSV-Panthers". Right in their debut season, the Redshirts managed to secure the championship. At the German Futsal Championships in 2018, the HSV team failed to reach the semi-finals against the eventual title holders VfL 05 Hohenstein-Ernsttahl. 

Just one year later, the HSV Panthers narrowly missed out on the title in a contested DM final when the team led by German internationals Ian-Prescott Claus, Michael Meyer, Onur Saglam and Nico Zankl were beaten 4-5 by TSV Weilimdorf from Stuttgart.

In the 2019/2020 season, the Regionalliga Nord had to be cancelled due to the development of the coronavirus. Nevertheless, eight clubs, including the HSV Panthers, competed for the title of German champions. Despite a 2:0 lead, the HSV team ultimately lost 3:5 to MCH Futsal-Club from Sennestadt. In the following season, the Red Shirts won the North German Championship and were only narrowly beaten by TSV Weilimdorf in the final for the German Championship. 

In the 2021/2022 season, the Panthers finished 4th in the Bundesliga and were defeated in the semi-finals of the playoffs by the champions Stuttgarter Futsal Klub.

International successes 
At international level, the Panthers took part in the Futsal Champions League for the first time in 2012, but narrowly failed in the preliminary round. The following season, however, the Hamburg team improved their performance and qualified for the main round. In 2015, the team managed to repeat this performance. The Hamburg boys achieved their greatest international success in 2016 and, after surviving the main round, entered the elite round as one of the best 16 teams in Europe. To date, no other German team has achieved this success.

Honours 
🥇 German Futsal Champion (2012, 2013, 2015 & 2016)

🥈German runner-up (2019, 2021)

🥇North German Futsal Champion (2012, 2015, 2016, 2018, 2019, 2021)

Players and coaches 

Squad season 2016/17 at UEFA official site, .

External links
Official Website
UEFA Profile

Sport in Hamburg
Futsal clubs in Germany
Futsal clubs established in 2011
2011 establishments in Germany

Hamburger SV